Whipped is a 2020 Indonesian comedy film directed by Chandra Liow, written by Jovial Da Lopez and Tanya Yuson and starring Andovi Da Lopez, Jovial Da Lopez and Tommy Limm. The plot revolves around four men, Andovi, Jovial, Chandra and Tommy, who joins a programme to improve their love lives. The film was released on September 18, 2020 on Netflix.

Cast
 Andovi Da Lopez as Andovi
 Jovial Da Lopez as Jovi
 Tommy Limm as Tommy
 Chandra Liow as Chandra
 Susan Sameh as Vania
 Karina Salim as Julia
 Kezia Aletheia as Cilla
 Ibob Tarigan as Indra
 Widika Sidmore as Kirana
 Gading Marten
 Deddy Corbuzier
 Uus
 Helmy Yahya
 Niniek L. Karim
 Yudha Keling

Release
The film was released direct-to-streaming on September 18, 2020 by Netflix.

References

External links
 
 
 

2020 films
Indonesian-language Netflix original films
2020s Indonesian-language films
2020 direct-to-video films
2020 comedy-drama films
Indonesian comedy-drama films